Philippe Bas (born 31 October 1973) is a French actor.

Personal life
From 2010 to 2012, he was in couple with the French singer Lorie.

Theater

Filmography

References

External links 

French male film actors
Living people
20th-century French male actors
21st-century French male actors
French male television actors
1973 births
Male actors from Paris